Icenhower Ridge is a broad, mainly ice-covered ridge that rises to over  between Yancey Glacier and Sennet Glacier in the Britannia Range, Antarctica.

References

Ridges of Oates Land